Cyrano and d'Artagnan is a 1964 French adventure film directed by Abel Gance, starring José Ferrer and Jean-Pierre Cassel. It is set in 1642 and tells the story of how the poet and duelist Cyrano de Bergerac teams up with the musketeer d'Artagnan in order to stop a plot against king Louis XIII. The film draws from Edmond Rostand's 1897 play Cyrano de Bergerac and Alexandre Dumas' three-volume novel d'Artagnan Romances. Ferrer repeated his role from the 1950 film Cyrano de Bergerac. Cyrano and d'Artagnan had 651,213 admissions in France.

Cast
 José Ferrer as Cyrano de Bergerac
 Jean-Pierre Cassel as d'Artagnan
 Sylva Koscina as Ninon de l'Eclos
 Daliah Lavi as Marion de l'Orme
 Rafael Rivelles as Cardinal Duc de Richelieu
 Laura Valenzuela as queen Anne of Austria
 Julián Mateos as Marquis de Cinq-Mars
 Michel Simon as the old guard
 Philippe Noiret as king Louis XIII
 Gabrielle Dorziat as Mme de Mauvières
 Ivo Garrani  as Laubardemont

Reception
Eugene Archer of The New York Times reviewed the film: "Judging strictly by the title, Cyrano and D'Artagnan does not sound a bit more promising than Samson Meets Hercules. Strange to say, despite the auspices of the New York Film Festival and the reputation of the 75-year-old director, Abel Gance, there is really not much difference between the Cyrano epic and the kind of dubbed Italian spectacle usually inflicted on us by Joseph E. Levine." The critic continued: "José Ferrer, repeating his Oscar-winning Cyrano role 14 years later, gives a flat and clumsy performance, while Jean-Pierre Cassel's D'Artagnan is swaggering and singularly lacking in charm. ... Let it be said for the director, known mainly for a silent triple-screen Napoleon in the nineteen-twenties, that he displays a nice eye for color. Otherwise, his handling of a routine commercial assignment is just that—routine."

References

External links

1960s historical adventure films
1964 films
French historical adventure films
1960s buddy films
French crossover films
Films based on Cyrano de Bergerac (play)
Films based on works by Alexandre Dumas
Films directed by Abel Gance
Films set in Paris
Films set in the 1640s
1960s French-language films
French swashbuckler films
Cultural depictions of Cardinal Richelieu
Cultural depictions of Charles de Batz de Castelmore d'Artagnan
Cultural depictions of Louis XIII
1960s French films